Robert Fate (born Robert Fate Bealmear, 1935) is an American author, best known for the Baby Shark series of mystery novels.

Born in 1935 in Oklahoma City, Oklahoma, Fate joined the US Marine Corps after High School. He used his GI Bill to go to schools in the US as well as the Sorbonne in Paris.

Before becoming a writer he worked in various fields and won an Oscar for his work in motion picture special effects

Awards
For the Baby Shark series
2008 Anthony award Finalist
Book of the Year Finalist, Foreword Magazine
Editor's Choice Award Finalist, Allbooks Review
Optioned by Brad Wyman

Bibliography
Baby Shark (2006) 
Baby Shark’s Beaumont Blues (2007) 
Baby Shark’s High Plains Redemption (2008) 
Baby Shark's Jugglers at the Border (2009) 
 'Kill the Gigolo' ' (2010)
 Baby Shark's Showdown at Chigger Flats (2011)

References

AMPAS Oscar Technical Award

External links
Official Website
Bibliography
Interview on Reviewing The Evidence

University of Paris alumni
Academy Award for Technical Achievement winners
1935 births
Living people
21st-century American novelists
American male novelists
American mystery writers
Writers from Oklahoma City
21st-century American male writers
Novelists from Oklahoma
American expatriates in France